Burrowing goby may refer to:

Croilia mossambica, also known as the naked goby, a species of goby native to Mozambique and South Africa
Trypauchen vagina, a species of goby found in the Indo-Pacific region